Barikadimy Stadium is a multi-purpose stadium in Toamasina, Madagascar. It is currently used mostly for football matches. It hosts the home games of AS Fortior of the THB Champions League. The stadium has a capacity 25,000 spectators.

References

Football venues in Madagascar
Toamasina